"Spider-Man" is the name of several superheroes in the Marvel Universe. The first titular and main protagonist is Peter Parker, created by Stan Lee and Steve Ditko. Other characters have adopted the alias over the years in the Earth 616 universe such as Ben Reilly and Otto Octavius. There also consists of alternate universe versions of the web-slinger such as May "Mayday" Parker and Miguel O'Hara.

Characters named Spider-Man

Peter Parker

Peter Parker, the Amazing Spider-Man, is the mainstream and original Earth-616 incarnation of the character and appears in almost every piece of Spider-Man related media.

Ben Reilly

Ben Reilly is a clone of Peter Parker, who also briefly fought crime as the Scarlet Spider. He also took over as Spider-Man (with a new costume) when Peter retired to settle down with a new family. This lasted until the original Green Goblin returned and murdered him.

Spider-X

Spider-X (Brian Kornfield), created by Mort Todd, first appeared in Midnight Sons Unlimited #3 (Oct. 1993). As Spider-X was seen by many wearing Spider-Man's costume, he is initially believed to be Spider-Man himself, mutated by the Darkhold, Until his own mother learned the truth and explained this to the titular group. Kornfield grew up off Broadway in New York City raised by his mother, with his father having been killed at an unknown time period. He had a very active imagination and idolized all superheroes, even writing letters to as many as he could. His mother was brutally assaulted and mugged on New York's streets. Brian was obsessed with being a superhero so he could find and take down the muggers. Brian was met by the Dwarf (an agent of the Elder God Chthon) offering him the power to be like his idol Spider-Man via a page of the Darkhold. Brian accepted the offer and was transformed into Spider-X. His obsessive desire for vengeance was twisted even further by the Darkhold's black magic and Brian saw himself as the ultimate arbitrator of justice, willing to mete out punishment that no one else would. Spider-X first brutally slew his mother's mugger. He then captured and planned to slay some other criminals, which brought him into conflict with the Ghost Rider and John Blaze when the two crashed into Spider-X's web that had been spun across the entire street. The conflict ended inconclusively when Spider-X fled from the Ghost Rider's Penance Stare; his eight eyes may have somehow diluted the Stare's force, allowing him to break hold. The occult investigators/warriors the Nightstalkers came to New York and investigated a previous letter from Kornfield, which claimed there is an occult basis to the rise in New York City's crime. Spider-X attacked the three of them when his mother was questioned. His struggles escalated, bringing in some of the Darkhold Redeemers summoned by the energy released by the use of a Darkhold page, as well as Morbius the Living Vampire and even Spider-Man himself. Still seeking to punish criminals, Spider-X continued to fight off the occult investigators/warriors and traveled to the 14th Street power station where the mutant criminal the Paralyzer was using the electrical energy for the electrical monster Zzzax's recreation. Spider-X attacked Zzzax and the group of heroes fighting him poured their own powers into the conflict which caused an energy overload, apparently both killing Spider-X and dissipating Zzzax. 

When Spider-X first obtained his powers, he could tap into mystical power to achieve virtually limitless variations/amplifications of Spider-Man's powers. He also possessed a high degree of resistance to injury, including mystical assaults. He could recover from most attacks in seconds. He could climb walls and adhere to virtually any surface. He could form durable, adhesive webs which exuded a powerful acid. He possesses four extra spider-like limbs, two of which grew from his upper back and two from his waist. He had razor-sharp fangs and could project bursts of destructive energy from his mouth. Brian Kornfield became a demonic version of Spider-Man after making a deal with the Elder God Chthon.

In other media
Spider-X is featured as a playable character in Spider-Man Unlimited.

Mac Gargan

While possessing the Venom symbiote, Mac Gargan posed as Spider-Man as a member of the Dark Avengers until his capture at the end of the "Siege" storyline.

Mattie Franklin

The niece of J. Jonah Jameson. After being granted spider-powers by "The Gathering of Five", she filled in for Peter Parker during one of his temporary retirements and later became Spider-Woman when he reclaimed the role. She was killed by the Kravinoff family during "The Gauntlet" and "Grim Hunt" storylines. During the "Dead No More: The Clone Conspiracy" storyline, she was briefly resurrected, only to die again at the end of the storyline.

Anansi
A member of the Vodu pantheon, he was the very First Spider-Man, according to Ezekiel Sims and the Ashanti tribe in Ghana.

Ai Apaec

Ai Apaec is the Marvel Comics version of the chief deity of Moche culture, and a supervillain in the Marvel Universe.

Ai Apaec first appeared in the first issue of the 2011 Osborn miniseries, and was created by Kelly Sue DeConnick and Jamie McKelvie.

Ai Apaec began appearing as a regular character in the Dark Avengers series, beginning with issue #175.

Ai Apaec is a chimeric being that has the head, torso, and arms of a human, the lower half being a spider's body, snakes for hair, and long sharp fangs. He was worshipped by the Moche people of South America (Peru). He was eventually captured by government officials and held in a secret government base somewhere underwater. Ai Apaec ends up meeting Norman Osborn when he ends up transferred to the secret base from the Raft. He joins Osborn, Dr. June Covington, the Kingmaker III, and Carny Rives into staging a break-out. The inmates secure an escape pod to get to the surface. Afterwards, Ai Apaec returns to the jungle.

During the Spider-Island storyline, Shang-Chi and Iron Fist discover that Ai Apaec was controlling Bride of Nine Spiders of the Immortal Weapons to capture the other members. As Iron Fist fights Ai Apaec, Shang-Chi manages to free the other members where Shang-Chi mutates into a humanoid spider. Upon Iron Fist using his chi to cure Shang-Chi, Iron Fist gets the other Immortal Weapons members to safety while Shang-Chi collapses the hideout on top of Ai Apaec. Afterwards, the Avengers arrested Ai Apaec.

When Osborn reclaimed ownership of H.A.M.M.E.R., he manages to locate Ai Apaec and recruit him to his latest incarnation of the Dark Avengers alongside Barney Barton, Gorgon, June Covington, Skaar, and Superia. To make Ai Apaec his latest Spider-Man, Osborn gives Ai Apaec a genetic-modifying drug that alters his appearance to resemble a six-armed version of the black suit Spider-Man. Ai Apaec and the Dark Avengers' other members are defeated by both Avengers teams when it turns out that his teammate Skaar was the Avengers' double-agent. Ai Apaec's drug wore off and Captain America knocked him unconscious.

When the Thunderbolts were missing in time, Ai Apaec was present when the Dark Avengers were recruited by Luke Cage to be a replacement team. Ai Apaec and the other Dark Avengers members were implanted with nanites in order to prevent them from going rogue, and placed under the leadership of Luke Cage.

Ai Apaec and the rest of the Dark Avengers team are thrown into an alternate world with John Walker. Ai Apaec was shown to have been shrunk down when he is a prisoner in Iron Man's lab. When Hank Pym mentions having regrown the U.S. Agent's limbs and shrunk Ai Apaec, Iron Man lashes out at him and realizes that Henry Pym's control implant had been reworked. The Dark Avengers make their way through Hell's Kitchen to get to Strangetown. They come across a building covered with webs as Ai Apaec claims that this world's Spider-Man must have gone through a profound change to have created such a long-lasting web. During the fight between the Dark Avengers and Spider-Man's gang, Ai Apaec tells Barney to load him onto an arrow and fire it at Spider-Man. Spider-Man's spider-sense goes off and he catches the arrow as Ai Apaec and Spider-Man speak in a different language, while the other Dark Avengers are subdued. With help from Ai Apaec, June Covington tells them that they had poisoned Hawkeye on his left side and that the venom must be sucked out. Later on, the Dark Avengers and Spider-Man's gang arrive in Strangetown, where they are attacked by the All-Seeing Eye and the Soulsnake. Ai Apaec tells Spider-Man to cast some webbing and give Barney Barton a sword which he uses to destroy the Soulsnake, while Spider-Man lands a hard kick to the All-Seeing Eye. Ai Apaec climbs on Doctor Strange's leg, telepathically calling the Dark Avengers to summon an object contained by Spider-Man's webs, which would grant him the perfect distraction. Enraged at the death of Clea, Doctor Strange readies an even more powerful spell. Before he can cast the spell, however, Ai Apaec hits him with all the venom he had, killing Doctor Strange and freeing Moonstone and Skaar from his spell. Ai Apaec and the Dark Avengers later return to their reality. When Ai Apaec reminds the Dark Avengers that he must be restored to his proper size, June Covington steps on him.

Ai Apaec has superhuman strength where it was stated that he was strong enough to rip off a man's head. His long, sharp teeth contain a powerful venom and he has enhanced senses. His spider legs can enable him to cling to solid walls and surfaces. Like the diving bell spider, Ai Apaec can wrap himself in a bell-shaped web held by the hair on his legs and abdomen and collect oxygen from the water to exchange the carbon dioxide with the oxygen.

During the "Spider-Verse" event, the Earth-1771 version of Ai Apaec is attacked by Karn. After a short battle, Karn drains away Apaec's essence, reducing him to dust.

In other media
Ai Apaec appears as a playable character in Spider-Man Unlimited.

Otto Octavius

Otto Octavius swapped bodies with Peter Parker during the "Dying Wish" storyline, with Peter dying in his body. Possessing his host's body and memories, Otto was determined to both prove himself better as Spider-Man than Peter and a better man as the Superior Spider-Man, but was eventually forced to sacrifice himself to restore his host when his focus on the larger picture and his own ego resulted in the Goblin King taking control of New York City in a massive attack at the Goblin Nation.

Miles Morales 

Miles Morales, a half Puerto Rican and half Black teenager from the Ultimate Marvel universe (Earth-1610), has an origin almost identical to Peter Parker, but has the ability to shock people (in which he calls his venom) and the ability to turn invisible. After he was brought into the mainstream 616 universe, he keeps fighting crime as Spider-Man.

Other versions of Spider-Man
 The Scarlet Spider is an alias of four characters that are similar in powers and abilities to Spider-Man.
 Other clones of Peter Parker have also appeared, such as Kaine, the degenerated first clone, and Spidercide, the shape-shifting third clone.
 The Blood Spider is an evil version of Spider-Man hired by the Red Skull and trained by the Taskmaster. His costume is a combination of the original and black costumes, and he has tanks for his web fluid on his back with hoses leading to the web-shooters on his wrists. His partners Jagged Bow (an evil version of Hawkeye) and Death-Shield (an evil version of Captain America) were also trained by the Taskmaster. The trio was next seen trying to kill Agent Venom when they were hired by Lord Ogre.
 The Spider Doppelganger is a six-armed evil version of Spider-Man created by the Magus during the Infinity War.
 Ezekiel Sims has powers similar to those of Spider-Man, but mystical in origin. He is a member of the Spider Society and its front organization, WebCorps.
 The Tarantula: Several characters have used this identity; see the main article for details.
 The Steel Spider is Ollie Osnick, originally a teenager who idolized Doctor Octopus and designed his own mechanical tentacles. Later, he was so impressed by Spider-Man that he modified his tentacles into spider-legs.
 Web-Man, a clone of Spider-Man made by Doctor Doom in an Electric Company comic book. He wears the inverse of Spider-Man's colors (red where blue should be and vice versa), and has criminal tendencies. He, along with his other clones, are destroyed when Spider-Man destroys the cloning machine Doctor Doom used.
 Several characters have used the Spider-Woman identity: Jessica Drew, Julia Carpenter (also called Arachne), Mattie Franklin, and Charlotte Witter. There is a version of Spider-Woman in the Ultimate Universe, a female clone of Peter Parker. 
 Madame Web, a precognitive ally of Spider-Man and the Spider-Women.
 Anya Corazon, a young Latina Latino-American heroine with spider-powers, formerly an employee of WebCorps.
 Silk, a Korean-American girl who was bitten by the same radioactive spider as Peter Parker.
 The Symbiotes, Venom and all of his descendants possess the powers of Spider-Man.
 Spider-Gwen, a girl who got her powers through a spider virus then lost them when the cure was distributed throughout the city. Later she was hit with a power gem and got her powers back.

Other examples
 A Spider-Man robot called the Timespinner is created by Kang the Conqueror to defeat the Avengers. It is deactivated, but later returns with the ability to drain temporal energy from people. It is destroyed by Ben Reilly and the Avengers.
 Spider-Man villains such as the Chameleon, Mysterio, and Kraven the Hunter have all masqueraded as Spider-Man.
 Deadpool briefly masqueraded as Spider-Man.
 There have been also some unnamed Skrulls, who disguised themselves as Spider-Man, including the Hulkling.

Alternative versions

Outside of the mainstream Marvel Universe of Earth-616, there exists many versions of Spider-Man.

References

Articles about multiple fictional characters
Lists of Spider-Man characters
 
M